Unifly Express  was an Italian airline that operated from 1980 until 1990.

Company history

Unifly began operations as a charter airline in 1980 with mostly business charters and overnight package delivery. In 1984 it entered the scheduled passenger service with Fokker F28 aircraft.  In 1985 it formed a cooperations with Alitalia and operated flights on its behalf. Unifly also operated freight flights with McDonnell Douglas DC-9-15RC aircraft.

In 1989 the name was changed to Unifly Express and with it came the first McDonnell Douglas MD-83. A total of five MD-82s and one MD-83 were operated. In 1990 Unifly Express took over Alinord and with it came a northern Italy route network and more F28s, but shortly afterward Unifly was having financial problems. The MD-80s were returned to the lessors and by May 1990 it was all over and Unifly ceased to exist.

Fleet details

See also 
 List of defunct airlines of Italy

References

External links

Fleet and code data

Italian companies established in 1980
Italian companies disestablished in 1990
Defunct airlines of Italy
Airlines established in 1980
Airlines disestablished in 1990